George William Scott (born 25 October 1944) is a Scottish footballer who played as a midfielder in the Football League for Tranmere Rovers.

References

External links

Tranmere Rovers F.C. players
Liverpool F.C. players
Aberdeen F.C. players
Expatriate soccer players in South Africa
Association football midfielders
Scottish Football League players
English Football League players
1944 births
Living people
Scottish footballers
Scottish expatriate footballers
Footballers from Aberdeen